Ryan M. Truex (born March 18, 1992) is an American professional stock car racing driver. He currently competes part-time in the NASCAR Xfinity Series, driving the No. 19 Toyota Supra for Joe Gibbs Racing. Truex's older brother Martin was the 2017 NASCAR Cup Series champion.

Racing career

Early career

A native of Mayetta, New Jersey, Truex won the 2009 NASCAR Camping World East Series Championship as a 17-year-old high school student at Southern Regional High School.

In the 11-race season, he finished the season with eight Top 5s. He had three wins at Watkins Glen, Thompson, and Lime Rock Park.

In 2010, he won his second consecutive Camping World East Series title in a Michael Waltrip-owned Toyota.

Touring series
Truex competed in six NASCAR Nationwide Series events, beginning at Gateway International Raceway on July 17, 2010. Truex was intended to run for Rookie of the Year in 2011 with MWR. However, motocross stunt performer Travis Pastrana ran the No. 99 for 7 races. Truex planned to skip ROTY and run 10 consecutive races in the Nationwide Series, then 20 races in 2012, though surgery forced him out of the 99 at Texas and was replaced by David Reutimann and team owner Waltrip, who drove at the restrictor plate tracks.  Waltrip and Ryan's brother Martin also split time in the ride.

Due to a lack of sponsorship in the 99 team, Truex was released from Pastrana Waltrip Racing after the STP 300. Truex returned to the Nationwide Series with Joe Gibbs Racing, running several races late in the 2011 season. In 2012, he drove for Tommy Baldwin Racing in the season-opening DRIVE4COPD 300 at Daytona International Speedway, finishing 31st. He ran a limited schedule for JGR, while he also drove for RAB Racing at Texas Motor Speedway in April.

On June 2, 2012, Truex got a career best finish of second at Dover International Speedway driving for JGR. Racing shortly after an emergency appendectomy, he started the race first after winning his first career Nationwide Series pole, and led late before being caught in lapped traffic by Joey Logano.

National series
In February 2013, Truex announced that he would compete in the Camping World Truck Series for Turner Scott Motorsports at Daytona International Speedway; he hoped to compete in further races during the year and registered to compete for the series' Rookie of the Year title. In addition, he signed with Phoenix Racing to compete in the Sprint Cup Series, competing in at least one race at Richmond International Raceway, as well as at Indianapolis Motor Speedway for the team in the Nationwide Series; his debut in the Sprint Cup Series and his Nationwide Series race was later delayed due to Truex suffering a broken collarbone.

On June 2, 2013, it was announced that Truex had signed with Richard Petty Motorsports as a development driver; in mid-July it was announced that he would make his Sprint Cup debut with Phoenix Racing in the Irwin Tools Night Race at Bristol Motor Speedway driving James Finch's No. 51. After Harry Scott Jr.'s takeover of the No. 51 team two weeks later, Truex drove for Scott in his first race as team owner at Richmond International Raceway. He drove for Scott again at his home track of Dover International Speedway, finishing 32nd.

In January 2014, Truex drove for BK Racing during testing prior to the 2014 Daytona 500 in the No. 93.  He was later assigned to the team's No. 83 for the full season. Truex also drove the No. 32 Bass Pro Shops Chevrolet for Turner Scott Motorsports in the season-opening Camping World Truck Series race at Daytona International Speedway. In August he suffered a sprained wrist and concussion in a practice crash at Michigan International Speedway; he was forced to sit out that weekend's race, being replaced by J. J. Yeley.

In September, Truex was replaced in the No. 83 car by Travis Kvapil in races at New Hampshire Motor Speedway and Dover International Speedway; discussions about his position with the team for the remainder of the season were said to be "ongoing". During the race weekend at Dover, Truex confirmed that he was no longer with BK Racing. After receiving no rides in 2015, Truex was picked up by Biagi-DenBeste Racing to drive three races starting at Richmond in the Xfinity Series.

After not finding a ride in 2015, in 2016, Truex returned to the Truck Series for the season opener at Daytona, driving the No. 81 for Hattori Racing Enterprises. Truex ran in the top ten for a portion of the race, and was in the lead on the last lap when he lost support from Parker Kligerman. After finishing 2nd, he announced he was running Atlanta, Martinsville, Kansas and hoped to run the whole season. Unfortunately though, sponsorship had been an issue for the team, he was replaced by Jesse Little for Texas, and was reduced to a limited schedule for the rest of the year. But Truex returned to HRE in 2017, now running the full Truck schedule in the renumbered No. 16. After finishing ninth in points with 13 top-ten finishes (including eight in the top five) and two poles, he was released by HRE on January 4, 2018. However, his jobless status would not last long, as he signed with Kaulig Racing to drive their flagship No. 11 car in the NASCAR Xfinity Series for 2018 with sponsorship from partner Bar Harbor Foods. With 1 top 5 and 11 top 10 finishes, Truex finished 12th in points after being eliminated after the Round Of 12.

Truex lost his ride with Kaulig when Justin Haley was announced as his successor in the No. 11 for 2019. On January 16, Truex announced he would enter the Daytona 500 with Tommy Baldwin Racing, driving the No. 71. On January 25, 2019, it was announced that Truex would drive the No. 8 car for JR Motorsports part-time. Truex cold-texted team owner Dale Earnhardt Jr. to inquire about open rides in the offseason and was able to find a large enough budget to run part-time in the No. 8. In his first race with the team at Phoenix he scored his first top-five since Mid-Ohio by tying his best-career finish of 2nd.

In 2020, Truex returned to the Truck Series as he signed a six-race deal with Niece Motorsports starting with the Texas race in March. Truex initially sought a full-time ride with the team but was unable to bring enough sponsorship to secure a full season. After running nine races in 2020, with a best finish of 12th at Las Vegas and Kansas, Truex upgraded to a full-time schedule with Niece for the 2021 season.

Personal life
He is the younger brother of 2017 Cup Series champion and two-time Busch Series champion Martin Truex Jr., and the son of former Busch Series driver Martin Truex Sr.

Motorsports career results

NASCAR
(key) (Bold – Pole position awarded by qualifying time. Italics – Pole position earned by points standings or practice time. * – Most laps led.)

Monster Energy Cup Series

Daytona 500

Xfinity Series

Camping World Truck Series

K&N Pro Series East

 Season still in progress
 Ineligible for series points

References

External links

 
 

Living people
1992 births
People from Stafford Township, New Jersey
Racing drivers from New Jersey
NASCAR drivers
Southern Regional High School alumni
Sportspeople from Ocean County, New Jersey
Dale Earnhardt Inc. drivers
Joe Gibbs Racing drivers
JR Motorsports drivers
Michael Waltrip Racing drivers